The 140th Aviation Regiment is an aviation regiment of the U.S. Army. It has historically been associated with the California Army National Guard's 40th Infantry Division.

Previous aviation units in the California Army National Guard included the 140th Aviation Battalion, the 29th Aviation Company, and the 40th Aviation Company, which was mobilized for Vietnam service in 1968-69. 

Its official Lineage and Honors states:
Constituted 31 July 1987 in the California Army National Guard as the 140th Aviation, a parent regiment under the United States Army Regimental System

Organized 1 October 1987 from existing units to consist of the 1st Battalion and Companies D, E, and F, elements of the 40th Infantry Division, and Company G

Reorganized 1 March 1988 to consist of the 1st Battalion and Companies D, E, and F, elements of the 40th Infantry Division, the 3d Battalion, and Company G

Reorganized 1 September 1996 to consist of the 1st Battalion and Company F, elements of the 40th Infantry Division, the 3d Battalion, and Company G

History 
In 1994, the regiment's 1st Battalion and Companies D (Command), E (Assault), and F (Aviation Intermediate Maintenance) were part of the 40th  Division's Aviation Brigade, along with the 1st Squadron of the 18th Cavalry Regiment.

Current structure

 1st Battalion
 Company B
 Company C (Fort Lewis, Washington)
 Iraq SEP 2007-JUL 2008
 3rd Battalion (Security & Support) (UH-72A) (CA ARNG) at Army Aviation Support Facility, Stockton Metropolitan Airport
 Company B (UH-72A/B) at Army Aviation Support Facility, Buckley Space Force Base (CO ARNG)
 Detachment 1 (UH-72A) at Limited Army Aviation Support Facility at North Las Vegas Airport (NV ARNG)
 Company C (UH-72A) (NM ARNG) at the Army Aviation Operations Facility, Las Cruces International Airport.
 Detachment 1 at Oklahoma City (OK ARNG)
 Company D (UH-72A) (Air Ambulance) at Army Aviation Support Facility, Buckley Space Force Base (CO ARNG)
 Detachment 1 (UH-72A) at Limited Army Aviation Support Facility, North Las Vegas Airport (NV ARNG)

References

140
Military units and formations established in 1987